Hakimiyet-i Milliye (Turkish: National Sovereignty) was a Turkish newspaper established by Atatürk in 1920. It functioned as the major newspaper of Turkish nationalist movement during the Turkish War of Independence. The headquarters of the paper was in Ankara.

The first editor was Ahmet Ağaoğlu. Atatürk published editorials in the paper. Falih Rıfkı Atay was among its regular contributors. It was renamed to Ulus in 1934.

Notes

Defunct newspapers published in Turkey
Newspapers established in 1920
Publications disestablished in 1934
Turkish-language newspapers
Mustafa Kemal Atatürk
Mass media in Ankara